Of the 45 men elected president of the United States, 31 have had prior military service, while only 14 have had no prior military service.  Their service ranks range from private in a state militia to the general of the army.

History

Despite being commander-in-chief of the United States Armed Forces, prior military service is not a prerequisite for presidents of the United States.

Civil War-veteran presidents
After the American Civil War, whether a politician had fought greatly influenced the public's perception of his appropriateness for the presidency.  After a spate of such veteran-presidents, that influence diminished before being eliminated.

World War II-veteran presidents
So great was the influence of World War II on US politics, Dwight D. Eisenhower won the 1952 presidential election without any political experience.  This halo effect of the second world war benefited the successful political campaigns of John F. Kennedy, Richard Nixon, Lyndon B. Johnson, Ronald Reagan, and Jimmy Carter.  After the 1988 United States presidential election however, the shine had dulled on military-veteran politicians, and through 2012, "the candidate with the better military record lost."  , George H. W. Bush was the last president to have served in combat (as an aircraft carrier-based bomber pilot in WWII).

Vietnam-veteran presidents

The 48-year tenure of veteran presidents after World War II was a result of that conflict's "pervasive effect […] on American society."  In the late 1970s and 1980s, almost 60% of the United States Congress had served in World War II or the Korean War, and it was expected that a Vietnam veteran would eventually ascend to the presidency.  Yet, in the chronology of "major conflicts" involving the United States, the Vietnam War is the first to not produce a veteran president, an event that veteran and author Matt Gallagher called "no small feat for a country spawned in armed revolution."  By 2017, a "bamboo ceiling" was described as holding down and preventing those who served in Vietnam from becoming president.

Barack Obama's 2006 book The Audacity of Hope argued that baby boomers never left behind the anti-military psychodrama of the 1960s, and that played out in national politics.  During Bill Clinton's 1992 presidential campaign, James Carville succeeded in releasing Clinton's 1969 letter that "outlined his opposition to the [Vietnam] war and his decision to try his chances with the draft."  The positive effects of this release evidenced the diminished cachet of military service in presidential politics.  Donald Trump's 2016 campaign further cemented this; Trump was elected that November despite bragging about evading the draft, slandering Senator John McCain and other prisoners of war, and publicly feuding with Gold Star parents Khizr and Ghazala Khan.  Of this discrepancy, Gallagher said, "What’d once been sacred territory in American politics is now anything but."

In 2015, journalist James Fallows described the contemporary American's attitude toward their military as "we love the troops, but we’d rather not think about them".  Three years later, Gallagher noted that when given the opportunity to elect Vietnam veterans (Al Gore, McCain, and John Kerry), the US electorate declined.  He called this emblematic of the public's "vague sense of gratitude for service members" that eschews interest or understanding: Thank you for your service,' but spare the details, please."

Future
With the all-volunteer United States Armed Forces of 2018 comprising only 0.5% of the US populace, and "the inherent politicization of the wars [current and future politicians] fought in", Gallagher doubted the viability of future veteran-presidents; "If a Global War on Terror veteran does someday lead the White House, it’ll be in spite of their time in uniform, not assisted by it."

Politics

Asset
George Washington, William Henry Harrison, Ulysses S. Grant, and Dwight D. Eisenhower were all career soldiers who benefited from their popularity as successful wartime general officers.  Áine Cain with Military.com called veteran presidents "fitting", given their responsibility at the head of the military's command hierarchy.

Detriment
Military service has also been a political millstone for individuals seeking the presidency.

George W. Bush's service with the Air National Guard was a point of political contention in his 2000 and 2004 campaigns.  Kerry's tours in Vietnam were similarly questioned.  McCain's 2000 and 2008 presidential campaigns saw the retired captain's service used against him.  Donald Trump's five deferments from conscription during the Vietnam War dogged his first presidential campaign.  Joe Biden received criticism during his 2020 presidential campaign for his five student draft deferments.

Presidents Bill Clinton, George W. Bush, and Donald Trump all received criticism for deploying the military into combat while having not served in that capacity themselves.

Policy

As noted in The Atlantic, presidents' military histories influence their policy-making in office.

List of presidents

See also
 List of presidents of the United States by military rank

References

United States
military service
United States presidential history